Sir George Maurice O’Rorke (2 May 1830 – 25 August 1916) was a New Zealand politician, representing (as George O’Rorke) the Auckland seat of Onehunga, and later Manukau, and was Speaker of the House of Representatives. He was a committed provincialist and was the eighth Superintendent of the Auckland Province. Upon receiving his knighthood in 1880, he became known as Sir Maurice.

Early life
O’Rorke was born in Moylough, County Galway, Ireland, the third son of the Rev John O’Rorke (an Anglican minister and large landowner) and his third wife Elizabeth (née Dennis). He went to Trinity College, Dublin, getting a B.A. with high honours in classics in 1852. Immediately after finishing his university education, he sailed for Melbourne, Australia. Whilst this was the time of the Victorian gold rush, this was not his motivation. Rather, he had had an uncle, Henry Dennis, who had settled as a squatter in the Darling Downs in the early 1840s, but who had perished in the sinking of the Sovereign near Moreton Bay in 1847. After working in Victoria, Australia, on a farm, he came to Auckland in 1854, farming in Papakura and Onehunga, Auckland.

Career

He represented Onehunga, which became Manukau, from 1861 to 1902, except for 1891–1893 when he was out of Parliament. He was Minister of Immigration and Crown Lands 1873–1874 in the Waterhouse, Fox and Vogel ministries, but was sacked by Vogel, dissatisfied with his performance. He supported the Provincial system in New Zealand, and spoke out against its abolition by Vogel. He served as Chairman of Committees from 1871 to 1872.

O'Rorke served on the Auckland Provincial Council as councillor from November 1865 to October 1876.  From December 1865, he served as the council's 3rd (and last) Speaker. He was elected Superintendent in 1875 for a period of five weeks.

He was a notable Speaker of the House, serving from 11 July 1879 to 5 November 1902, except for 1891–1893. He supported education, and was in favour of Imperial Federation.

He was knighted in 1880, when he became Sir Maurice, although he had previously used George as his Christian name. In 1904 he was appointed to the Legislative Council, where he served until his death.

The student residential hall, O'Rorke Hall at the University of Auckland, is named after him.

Polo
A polo player, he was the Captain of the Auckland Polo Club.

Personal life
In 1858 he married Cecilia Mary Shepherd, daughter of Alexander Shepherd, the second Colonial Treasurer. They had one son, Edward (Eddie) Dennis O’Rorke (father of the architect Brian O'Rorke). Cecilia died on 19 September 1910. Sir Maurice died in Auckland in 1916, survived by his son.

Notes

References

|-

|-

|-

|-

|-

|-

|-

1830 births
1916 deaths
19th-century Irish people
Alumni of Trinity College Dublin
Members of the Cabinet of New Zealand
New Zealand MPs for Auckland electorates
Members of the Auckland Provincial Council
Superintendents of New Zealand provincial councils
New Zealand farmers
Politicians from County Galway
Speakers of the New Zealand House of Representatives
New Zealand Liberal Party MLCs
Irish emigrants to New Zealand (before 1923)
New Zealand Knights Bachelor
Members of the New Zealand House of Representatives
Members of Auckland provincial executive councils
Members of the New Zealand Legislative Council
Unsuccessful candidates in the 1902 New Zealand general election
Unsuccessful candidates in the 1890 New Zealand general election
New Zealand polo players
19th-century New Zealand politicians
New Zealand politicians awarded knighthoods
Justice ministers of New Zealand
Moorhouse–Rhodes family